Claudia L. Tenney (born February 4, 1961) is an American attorney and politician serving as the U.S. representative for New York's 24th congressional district since 2021, having previously represented the district from 2017 to 2019. Her district covers a large part of Central New York, extending from the east end of Lake Ontario to the Pennsylvania border and includes the cities of Utica, Rome and Binghamton. Redistricting led her to be elected to New York's 24th district in 2022 for the 2023-2025 term.

A member of the Republican Party, Tenney served in the New York State Assembly from 2011 to 2017. In 2014, she challenged incumbent U.S. Representative Richard L. Hanna in the Republican primary and lost. Tenney was elected to Congress in 2016 after Hanna retired. She narrowly lost reelection to Democrat Anthony Brindisi in 2018. Tenney challenged Brindisi in 2020; the seat remained vacant at the start of the 117th United States Congress because the race was too close to call. On February 5, 2021, New York Supreme Court Judge Scott DelConte ruled in Tenney's favor, allowing her to be declared the winner of the 2020 election. Tenney took office six days later.

Early life and education
Tenney was born and raised in New Hartford, New York. Her parents were Cynthia and New York State Supreme Court Justice John R. Tenney. She attended New Hartford High School, where she played basketball and curling and competed in horseback riding. She has a B.A. from Colgate University and a J.D. from the University of Cincinnati College of Law.

Early career
Early in her career, Tenney was the only American employed by the Consulate General of Yugoslavia. She acted as intermediary between ABC Sports and the Yugoslavian government leading up to the 1984 Winter Olympics in Sarajevo.

Tenney was a co-owner of Mid-York Press, a commercial printing company started by her mother's family in 1946. Mid-York Press is in Sherburne, in Chenango County.

Tenney maintained a private law practice in Clinton. Before owning her own firm, she was a partner at the Utica-area law firm of Groben, Gilroy, Oster and Saunders.

In January 2001, Tenney began co-hosting Common Cents, a radio and television program that airs weekly across Oneida and most of Herkimer County. In February 2010, she began co-hosting "First Look" on WIBX 950 Radio.

Early political involvement

In 2002, New York State Assemblyman David R. Townsend Jr. won reelection and asked Tenney to become his legal counsel and Chief of Staff. Though she was going through a divorce at the time, she agreed to take the positions part-time so she could continue operating her law practice and her family-owned newspaper.

In 2009, Tenney ran for Oneida County Surrogate Court Judge as a Republican against incumbent Democrat Louis Gigliotti. She received 45% of the vote to Gigliotti's 55%.

New York State Assembly

After Townsend launched a campaign for Oneida County Sheriff in 2010, Tenney decided to run for his Assembly seat. She defeated Oneida County Legislator George Joseph in the September Republican primary and was unopposed in the November general election, becoming the first woman to represent the district.

Tenney represented the 115th Assembly District from 2011 to 2013 and the 101st Assembly District from 2013 to 2017. In 2011, Tenney voted against the Marriage Equality Act. In 2012, Tenney was one of 18 cosponsors of the Internet Protection Act, a bill intended to fight online bullying, which did not pass. Also in 2012, the Conservative Party of New York State gave her an award for being the state's most conservative legislator. She voted against the 2013 gun control law known as the NY SAFE Act, which she called an "assault on upstaters." In 2014, the New York Public Interest Research Group (NYPIRG) claimed Tenney had missed 480 votes, the third-highest number of any Assembly member. WRVO, a National Public Radio affiliate in Oswego, fact-checked NYPIRG's claim and found that she had a 95% attendance record from 2011 to 2016 and had missed 6% of the votes taken during that period.

According to Syracuse.com, "Tenney was a vocal critic of a revenue-sharing deal the Turning Stone Resort Casino in Verona signed with New York state in 2013, in which the Oneida Indian National won exclusive rights to run casinos in a 10-county region of Central New York." Later, a Super PAC "with ties to the Oneida Indian nation" opposed her 2014 and 2016 congressional bids. Tenney voted against the 2013 state constitutional amendment that authorized full-fledged casinos on non-Indian lands.

U.S. House of Representatives

Elections

2014 

In 2014, Tenney ran for the Republican nomination for New York's 22nd congressional district, losing the June 24 primary to incumbent Republican Richard L. Hanna by six points, 47-53%. Tenney ran to the right of Hanna.

2016 

Tenney again sought election to Congress from the 22nd District in the 2016 elections. Hanna retired weeks later, denying that the prospect of a primary rematch with Tenney was a factor. Tenney was endorsed by the Conservative Party of New York State, the pro-life Susan B. Anthony List, the Citizens United Victory Fund, and New Yorkers for Constitutional Freedoms PAC. Hanna did not endorse her.

Tenney won a three-way Republican primary on June 28, 2016. She defeated Democrat Kim Myers and Independent/Reform Party candidate Martin Babinec in the November general election with 44% of the vote to Myers's 39% and Babinec's 13%.

2018 

On March 3, 2018, Tenney confirmed that she would seek reelection in 2018. The Democrats nominated New York State Assemblymember Anthony Brindisi of nearby Utica, who had served alongside Tenney in the Assembly. Brindisi outraised Tenney, ending the year with $581,851 to Tenney's $573,486. In March 2018, The Hill wrote that Tenney was "embracing President Trump's confrontational style." In August, Trump spoke at a fundraiser for Tenney in Utica, the first time a president had visited the Mohawk Valley in nearly 70 years.

On election night, Brindisi led by 1,293 votes. By November 20, Brindisi's lead grew to over 3,900 votes, exceeding the number of outstanding absentee ballots. On November 21, Tenney told local radio station WUTQ-FM that it was unlikely she would overtake Brindisi, and agreed to help with the transition, but said that she wanted to see every ballot counted. She conceded a week later, on November 28. Her defeat made New York's 22nd congressional district the most pro-Trump congressional district in the nation flipped by a Democrat in 2018.

2020 

Tenney sought election to Congress in New York's 22nd congressional district once again in 2020. She won the Republican primary and challenged incumbent Anthony Brindisi in the general election. As of December 2, Tenney held a 12-vote lead in the general election; the race was one of two U.S. House races that remained unresolved. On December 8, a New York state judge ordered a districtwide recanvass of all ballots, including provisional ballots and disputed ballots that were not included in the original count.

On February 5, 2021, Tenney was declared the winner of the election by 109 votes. She appeared to get a boost from President Trump, who won the district with 54.7% of the vote. She assumed office on February 11, 2021, nearly a month after most of her colleagues were sworn in. Afterward, Tenney filed her candidacy for 2022.

Tenure and political positions
In a radio interview shortly after the February 2018 Stoneman Douglas High School shooting in Parkland, Florida, Tenney baselessly claimed that "so many of these people that commit the mass murders end up being Democrats". In a follow-up interview, she said, "This problem occurs across all sectors, with all types of people. It isn't just Republicans who commit all these terrible crimes. It is across all sectors and it is people who are typically mentally unstable who are committing a lot of the crimes that we're seeing."
		
When reports emerged that Secretary of Housing and Urban Development Ben Carson's office had ordered a $31,000 dining room table set with taxpayer funds, Tenney blamed the "deep state" for the expenditure, adding, "I know that Ben Carson did not order that table. It has nothing to do with him. He comes from, you know, poverty."

In March 2017, Tenney voted to reverse the FCC privacy rule that blocked ISPs from selling customer browsing history without customers' permission.

In November 2017, Tenney introduced the No Pensions for Corrupt Politicians Act, which would "close a loophole that has allowed corrupt members of Congress to collect federal pensions after they are convicted of crimes."

In April 2018, Tenney signed a letter calling for criminal investigations into a number of former Obama administration officials and high-ranking Justice Department officials. The letter accused former FBI Director James Comey of leaking classified information, 2016 presidential candidate Hillary Clinton of concealing payments for the Steele Dossier, and Loretta Lynch of threatening whistle-blowers who had anti-Clinton information. The letter also accused former acting attorney general Sally Yates, former deputy FBI director Andrew McCabe, former acting Deputy Attorney General Dana Boente, former senior counterintelligence official Peter Strzok and FBI attorney Lisa Page of criminal wrongdoing.

Tenney was a member of the Climate Solutions Caucus. In 2016, she cast doubt on the scientific consensus on climate change, saying, "The science is not determined. It’s not certain." In 2017, she supported President Trump's decision to leave the Paris Agreement.

In March 2021, along with all other Senate and House Republicans, she voted against the American Rescue Plan Act of 2021.

At a January 5, 2021 rally in Georgia, President Donald Trump falsely claimed the votes in Tenney's race against Anthony Brindisi were being counted fraudulently (at the time, the Tenney-Brindisi race was the nation's only uncalled 2020 congressional race). Tenney shared a video of Trump's speech and did not challenge or dispute Trump's claims. In February 2021, following the U.S. Capitol attack, Tenney said she did not know whether she would have voted to count the electoral votes from the states Biden won in 2020, but that she would have voted against Trump's second impeachment. In May 2021, Tenney falsely suggested that the 2020 presidential election might have been "stolen"; there is no evidence of any meaningful fraud in the election.

Health care
On May 4, 2017, Tenney voted for the American Health Care Act (AHCA), a bill that passed the House of Representatives and died in the Senate. It would have rewritten many regulations of the Affordable Care Act (ACA) and eliminated the individual mandate and federal protections for preexisting conditions in favor of high-risk pools. Tenney also voted for a portion of the AHCA that targeted Medicaid funding by prohibiting Medicaid-related property taxes. The provision applied only to New York State, and only to counties outside of New York City. Tenney argued the overall bill would lower insurance costs, including insurance premiums and related taxes.

In 2021, amid the COVID-19 pandemic, Tenney opposed the Biden administration's vaccine mandate for companies with more than 100 employees, calling it "unconstitutional".

Islamic Republic of Iran
Claudia Tenney opposes misogynistic laws of the Islamic Republic of Iran and has introduced a bill in the House in 2023 to condemn that government. U.S. Representative Tenney introduced "H.Con.Res.7 - Condemning the Iranian regime's human rights abuses against the brave women and men of Iran peacefully demonstrating in more than 133 cities," into the 118th Congress's House Foreign Affairs Committee on 01/09/2023. This bill cites the Mahsa Amini protests.

Taxes
Tenney voted for the Tax Cuts and Jobs Act of 2017, which Trump signed into law in December 2017. The law's main provisions include a reduction of the top personal income tax rate from 39.6% to 37%, the elimination of the ACA's individual mandate, the limitation of the state and local tax deduction to $10,000 of taxable income, an increase in the standard deduction, and a reduction in the corporate tax rate from 35% to 21%. The reduction of the corporate tax rate is permanent; the personal income tax cuts are temporary. In October 2017, Tenney joined other members of Congress and Ivanka Trump at an event to advocate for doubling the child tax credit; this provision was included in the Tax Cuts and Jobs Act.

LGBT issues 
Tenney was one of the 14 co-sponsors of the "Protect Children’s Innocence Act", which would make giving transgender minors gender-affirming care a class C felony.

Tenney was the sole member of New York's House delegation to vote against the Respect for Marriage Act, which would codify Obergefell v. Hodges.

In the fall of 2022, after an attacker fractured the skull of Paul Pelosi, the husband of House Speaker Nancy Pelosi, a number of Republican politicians circulated a baseless allegation that the attacker was a male prostitute—among them, Tenney, who posted on her Twitter account, with the comment "LOL", a doctored photograph of a group of young men holding hammers next to a gay pride flag.

Gun control 
In 2017, Tenney co-sponsored legislation that would substantially eliminate National Firearms Act restrictions on obtaining or possessing gun silencers. After the 2017 Las Vegas shooting, she said she still planned to support the bill.

Personal life
Tenney is a resident of New Hartford, New York. She and her former husband, Wayne Cleary, Jr., have one son, Wayne "Trey" Ralph Cleary III. In 2009, the younger Cleary received an appointment to the U.S. Naval Academy. He was commissioned as a second lieutenant in the United States Marine Corps in May 2013.

Tenney is a Presbyterian.

See also
Women in the United States House of Representatives

References

External links

 Representative Claudia Tenney official U.S. House website
 Campaign website
 
 

|-

|-

|-

|-

 
|-

1961 births
21st-century American politicians
21st-century American women politicians
American Presbyterians
Candidates in the 2014 United States elections
Colgate University alumni
Female members of the United States House of Representatives
Journalists from New York (state)
Living people
Republican Party members of the New York State Assembly
New York (state) lawyers
People from Clinton, Oneida County, New York
People from New Hartford, New York
Presbyterians from New York (state)
Republican Party members of the United States House of Representatives from New York (state)
University of Cincinnati College of Law alumni
Women state legislators in New York (state)
People from Utica, New York